Cugino & cugino is a series that was broadcast on Italian television RAI 1 from February 22, 2011.
The series had one season of twelve episodes, which were broadcast over six nights.

Cast

Giulio Scarpati: Filippo Raimondi
Nino Frassica: Carmelo Mancuso
Gabriele Caprio: Marco Raimondi
Denny Méndez: Eleonora Muñez 
Pierpaola Janvier: Margherita
Euridice Axen: dott.ssa Monica Fontana
Giorgio Borghetti; Alex Maini
Edy Angelillo: Anna Fissore 
Francesco Scali: Nerone
Francesco Paolantoni: Babà

Episodes

See also
List of Italian television series

References

External links
 

Italian television series
2011 Italian television series debuts
2011 Italian television series endings
2010s Italian television series
RAI original programming